Tommy Haas was the defending champion, but did not participate as he was recovering from hip surgery.Lleyton Hewitt won 3–6, 7–6(7–4), 6–4 against Roger Federer to claim the title.

Seeds

Draw

Finals

Top half

Bottom half

References

Main Draw
Qualifying Draw

2010 Gerry Weber Open